Stanstead may refer to:

Canada
Stanstead, Quebec, a city in Canada
Stanstead, Quebec (township), Canada
Stanstead (electoral district), Quebec, Canada
Stanstead (Province of Canada electoral district), Canada East, Province of Quebec
Stanstead (provincial electoral district), Quebec, Canada

United Kingdom
Stanstead, Suffolk
Stanstead Abbotts, Hertfordshire

United States
The Stanstead, a historic building in Cambridge, Massachusetts

See also
 Stanstead-Est, Quebec, a municipality
London Stansted Airport
Stansted (disambiguation)